Isotenes is a genus of moths belonging to the family Tortricidae.

Species
Isotenes anisa  Diakonoff, 1983
Isotenes athliopa  (Meyrick, 1938) 
Isotenes clarisecta  Diakonoff, 1952
Isotenes crobylota  (Meyrick, 1910) 
Isotenes cryptadia  Diakonoff, 1948
Isotenes epiperca  Diakonoff, 1944
Isotenes erasa  Diakonoff, 1952
Isotenes eurymenes  (Meyrick, 1930) 
Isotenes inae  Diakonoff, 1948
Isotenes latitata Razowski, 2013
Isotenes marmorata  Diakonoff, 1952
Isotenes megalea  Diakonoff, 1952
Isotenes melanoclera  Meyrick, 1938
Isotenes melanopa  Diakonoff, 1952
Isotenes melanotes  Diakonoff, 1952
Isotenes mesonephela  Diakonoff, 1952
Isotenes miserana  (Walker, 1863) 
Isotenes ornata  Diakonoff, 1952
Isotenes prosantes  Diakonoff, 1952
Isotenes pudens  Diakonoff, 1952
Isotenes punctosa  Diakonoff, 1952
Isotenes rhodosphena  Diakonoff, 1952
Isotenes sematophora  Diakonoff, 1952
Isotenes syndesma Razowski, 2013
Isotenes tetrops  (Diakonoff, 1944) 
Isotenes thaumasia  Diakonoff, 1948

References

 , 1938: Papuan microlepidoptera. Transactions of the Royal Entomological Society of London, 87(21): 503–528.

External links

tortricidae.com

Archipini
Taxa named by Edward Meyrick
Tortricidae genera